Irfan is an ethereal world music band from Bulgaria formed in 2001. Their sound is an original electro-acoustic world fusion influenced by the sacred and folk music traditions of Bulgaria, the Balkans, Persia, the Middle East, North Africa and India, as well as by the musical and spiritual heritage of Byzantium and Medieval Europe.

Irfan extensively uses ethereal and mystic female vocals in addition to strong male vocals and choirs in combination with an assortment of traditional Bulgarian, Balkan, Oriental, Persian and Indian string, wind, key and percussive instruments woven into a delicate ambient electronic sound. The band’s name is borrowed from the Sufi’s terminology and means “gnosis”, “secret knowledge” or “revelation”.

Since 2003 Irfan has been on the French label Prikosnovénie with three released albums and several movie and theatrical soundtracks. Over the last decade Irfan toured with great success across Europe (Germany, The Netherlands, Belgium, Spain, Portugal, France, Denmark, Switzerland, Austria, The Czech Republic, Poland, Lithuania, Romania, Bulgaria, etc.) and performed live at some of the main European Gothic, neo folk, medieval and world music festivals and events.

Discography 
Full-length albums and EPs:
 Irfan (2003) - Prikosnovénie/Noir Records
 Seraphim (2007) - Prikosnovénie
 The Eternal Return (2015) - Prikosnovénie
 Roots (2018) - self-released

Compilation appearances:
'Otkrovenie' on Fairy World No. 1 Prikosnovénie (2003)
'Otkrovenie' on Dancing in the Dark: 10 Years of Dancing Ferret Dancing Ferret Discs (2005)
'Stella Splendens' on Fairy World II Prikosnovénie (2005)
'Otkrovenie' on Asleep By Dawn Magazine DCD 2005 Tour CD Asleep By Dawn (2005)
'Peregrinatio' on Asleep By Dawn Magazine DCD 2005 Tour CD Asleep By Dawn (2005)
'Star of the Winds' on Dancing in the Dark 2006: A Dancing Ferret Compilation Dancing Ferret Discs (2006)
'Fei' on Effleurment: A Prikosnovénie Compilation Prikosnovénie (2006)
Simurgh on Fairy World III Prikosnovénie (2007)

Band members 
Ivailo Petrov—oud, baglama saz, tambura, santour, setar, programming 
Kalin Yordanov—vocals, daf, bodhran
Peter Todorov—darbouka, tombak, riq, electronic percussion pad
Yasen Lazarov—kaval, nay, duduk, harmonium
Darina Zlatkova—vocals

References

External links

 Facebook page of the band
 
 Discogs Irfan discography
 Prikosnovénie description and interview 

Bulgarian musical groups
Prikosnovénie artists
World music groups